Blackhawk-Camino Tassajara is a former census-designated place (CDP) in Contra Costa County, California, near the town of Danville. The unincorporated area consisted of the Blackhawk planned community and the surrounding Camino Tassajara area. At the 2000 census, the CDP's population was 10,048. The CDP was split between Blackhawk and Camino Tassajara before the 2010 census.

Geography

Demographics
At the 2000 census, there were 10,048 people, 3,326 households and 3,010 families living in the area. The racial make-up of the area was 77.10% White, 2.31% Black or African American, 0.18% Native American, 16.78% Asian, 0.14% Pacific Islander, 0.75% from other races and 2.75% from two or more races. 3.89% of the population were Hispanic or Latino of any race.

There were 3,326 households, of which 46.2% had children under the age of 18 living with them, 84.2% were married couples living together, 4.0% had a female householder with no husband present, and 9.5% were non-families. 6.7% of all households were made up of individuals and 1.7% had someone living alone who was 65 years of age or older. The average household size was 3.01 and the average family size was 3.16.

29.0% of the population were under the age of 18, 4.% from 18 to 24, 24.0% from 25 to 44, 35.8% from 45 to 64 and 6.4% were 65 years of age or older. The median age was 41 years. For every 100 females, there were 97.3 males.  For every 100 females age 18 and over, there were 96.1 males.

The median household income was $154,598 and the median family income was $155,904. Males had a median income of over $100,000 and females $58,378. The per capita income was $66,972. About 0.2% of families and 0.9% of the population were below the poverty line, including 0.2% of those under age 18 and 0.6% of those age 65 or over.

Mailing address
Blackhawk-Camino Tassajara was included under Danville, California, for the purposes of mailing address.

References

Former census-designated places in California